Thomas Mäkinen (born 30 January 1997) is a Finnish professional football midfielder who plays for Finnish club FC Åland and Finland national under-21 football team. Mäkinen was born in Mariehamn, Finland.

Club career

IFK Mariehamn

He began his senior club career playing for IFK Mariehamn, and made his league debut for at age 18 in 2014. After winning his first trophy, the Finnish Cup, during his first full season on league level, he helped IFK Marehamn win the Veikkausliiga.

Renate

On 1 January 2017 Mäkinen signed a contract with A.C. Renate.

Return to IFK Mariehamn

On 17 January 2018, Mäkinen signed a 1 year contract with IFK Mariehamn.

FC Åland

FC Åland announced the signing of Mäkinen for the 2019 season. The deal was already announced on 7 November 2018.

International career

Mäkinen has represented Finland on youth level. He made his debut in the UEFA European Under-19 Championship qualifications in on 8 October 2015 in a match against Italy.

Career statistics

Club

Honours and achievements

Club

IFK Marehamn
Veikkausliiga: 2016
Finnish Cup: 2015

References

External links

 A.C. Renate official profile 
 
 

1997 births
Living people
Finnish footballers
Veikkausliiga players
Association football midfielders
IFK Mariehamn players
FC Åland players
A.C. Renate players
People from Mariehamn
Sportspeople from Åland